Ben Leber (born December 7, 1978) is a retired American football linebacker in the National Football League (NFL). He was drafted by the San Diego Chargers in the third round of the 2002 NFL Draft and later played for the Minnesota Vikings.

Early years
Lining up primarily at running back, Leber was named to several high school All-America teams at Vermillion High School in Vermillion, South Dakota. As a junior, he rushed for 1,404 yards and 18 touchdowns, and notched 1,350 yards in his senior year.  That season, he was declared a Parade Magazine All-America (the only South Dakotan so honored in 1997), an honorable mention All-USA by USA Today, and was selected to play in the North-South Dakota All-Star game. An excellent student, he was also an Academic All-State selection.

College career
At Kansas State, Leber made the switch to full-time linebacker.  A two-time All-Big 12 selection, he finished his college career with 216 tackles, 46 tackles for loss, and 13.5 sacks.  His 216 career tackles were the fifth most in Kansas State history.  As a junior, he earned second-team all-conference honors.  The year later, he was an All-America third-team selection by the Associated Press, a consensus All-Big 12 Conference first-team choice, and a team captain.  He received a degree in business-general management in 2002.

Professional career

Pre-draft

San Diego Chargers
Leber was drafted by the San Diego Chargers in the third round of the 2002 NFL Draft.  He was an immediate-impact rookie, playing in all 16 games and starting 14 of them.  He was selected to both the Pro Football Weekly and Football Digest All-Rookie teams, finishing the year with 49 tackles, 5 sacks (third on the team), and 3 forced fumbles (first on the team).

In his second season, Leber started every game at strong side linebacker for the Chargers, notching 75 tackles, 3 sacks, 1 pass defensed, and 1 forced fumble.  In his third year, he was an every-game starter for the Chargers, finishing the season with 58 tackles, 2 sacks, and 1 fumble recovery.  The next season, Leber was injured during training camp and again during the season.  This led to him losing his starting position to future Pro-Bowler Shawne Merriman.  He finished 2005 with 22 tackles, 2 sacks and 1 fumble recovery.

Minnesota Vikings
As an unrestricted free agent, Leber was signed by the Minnesota Vikings on March 11, 2006. Playing in 15 games, he finished his first season with the team with 46 tackles, 3 sacks, 1 interception, 3 forced fumbles, 2 fumble recoveries and 1 fumble recovery touchdown. The next year was even better—playing in all 16 games, Leber notched 67 tackles, 5 sacks, 2 forced fumbles, and 1 interception. In 2008, Leber again played the full season, recording 64 tackles, a career-low 1.5 sacks, and 2 interceptions.

St. Louis Rams
On August 9, 2011, Leber signed with the St. Louis Rams. On December 3, 2011, Leber was waived by the Rams.

Retirement
Despite having worked out for the Philadelphia Eagles in March 2012, he was unable to find an interested team.

He announced his retirement from professional football on June 18, 2012.

Career statistics

Career Playoff statistics

Personal
Leber was born in Council Bluffs, Iowa and raised in Vermillion, South Dakota. He is the son of Al and Han Leber. His brother, Jason, was an All-American running back at the University of South Dakota.

His Mother, Han, is Korean.

Leber is married to his wife Abby, and they have 2 sons and 1 daughter. Ben Leber was announced as co-host of the wildly popular show Twin Cities Live in May of 2022. He has a plethora of animals, including a stinky guinea pig, a large dog and cats. He coaches his children's sports teams and won a flag football tournament. He is a wellness enthusiast, a big fan of all things wellness, including laffy taffy. If he only got to eat one food for the rest of his life it would be a rib eye steak.  

He is a radio sideline analyst for the Minnesota Vikings. He also broadcasts on KFAN.

External links 
http://scout.scout.com/a.z?s=63&p=8&c=1&nid=2451843
http://www.nfl.com/players/ben-leber

References

1978 births
American sportspeople of Korean descent
American football outside linebackers
Players of American football from South Dakota
Minnesota Vikings players
San Diego Chargers players
St. Louis Rams players
Kansas State Wildcats football players
Living people
National Football League announcers
College football announcers